Infoblox, formerly (NYSE:BLOX), is a privately held IT automation and security company based in California's Silicon Valley. The company focuses on managing and identifying devices connected to networks—specifically for the Domain Name System (DNS), Dynamic Host Configuration Protocol (DHCP), and IP address management (collectively, "DDI"). According to Gartner, by 2015 the Infoblox market share was 49.9 percent of the $533 million enterprise DDI market. In June 2016, IDC, a market intelligence firm, named Infoblox as the dominant player in DNS, DHCP and IP address management. No other competitor had a market share greater than 15 percent.

History
Infoblox was founded in 1999 in Chicago, Illinois, by Stuart Bailey who was at the University of Illinois.  The company moved to Santa Clara, California, in 2003.

In 2007, Infoblox acquired French startup lpanto, which led to the development of IPAM Win Connect appliances. In 2010, Infoblox acquired Net Cordia which provided technologies for network task automation. Later in the same year, the company integrated Infoblox IP address management technology with Net Cordia's network configuration and change management technologies.
As virtualization and cloud computing became increasingly prevalent in data centers, automation was marketed using the term distributed virtual infrastructure. The company added DNS security products, and it also supplied hardware appliances to host its software.
Infoblox joined commercial and government groups, and independent research,  and made Tapestry, its open-source software

Network management became increasingly crucial, after a sharp rise in computer crime, especially attacks that exploit DNS servers, such as DNS spoofing and distributed denial-of-service attacks. In 2012, 7.8 million new malware threats emerged. Mobile threats grew by 1,000 percent, and 865 successful breaches compromised 174 million records. DNS servers in particular are vulnerable to hacking, and often used in destructive attacks such as the Syrian Electronic Army (SEA) attack that hit The New York Times and Twitter in 2013.
In December 2013, it estimated  6,000 customers, which included government organizations as well as businesses.

In February 2016, the company acquired IID, a cyberthreat intelligence company. On September 19, 2016, Vista Equity Partners announced intent to purchase Infoblox for approximately $1.6 billion. The acquisition closed in November. In June 2017, Infoblox announced an expansion to its Tacoma, Washington, office, which focuses on cybersecurity research, threat intelligence and engineering. In 2019, Infoblox introduced new updates to its Network Identity Operating System (NIOS) platform, including support for Google Cloud Platform and the option for single sign-on. In December 2019, Infoblox was included in the list for the Top 25 Cybersecurity Companies of 2019 by The Software Report.

On September 8, 2020, Infoblox announced a significant investment from Warburg Pincus. after necessary approvals, the investment closed on December 1, 2020, with Vista Equity Partners and Warburg Pincus holding 50% ownership in Infoblox.

On January 11, 2023, Infoblox appointed Scott Harrell as CEO and President.

Financial results
Infoblox received $80 million in five rounds of financing (2000, 2001, 2003, 2004 and 2005). The company's main investor was Sequoia Capital. 
The company had their initial public offering on April 20, 2012. Shares were listed on the New York Stock Exchange under the symbol BLOX.
The stock price advanced 40 percent in the first day of trading.
After adding 250 employees that year, Infoblox moved to Santa Clara. 
Earnings leading up through Q4 2013 showed financial as well as physical growth. Total net revenue for the fourth quarter of fiscal year 2013 was $63.1 million, an increase of 40 percent on a year-over-year basis. Total net revenue for fiscal 2013 was a record $225.0 million, an increase of 33 percent compared with the total net revenue of $169.2 million in fiscal 2012.
First quarter results for 2014 fell short of expectations, showing a drop share price.

By 2015, the Infoblox market share in DDI jumped to 49.9 percent in 2015 from 46.7 percent in 2014, and the overall DDI market grew 18.3 percent in the same period to $533 million. No other competitor had a market share greater than 15 percent.

Products
Infoblox products, platforms and network services includes: 
 Actionable Network Intelligence Platform  
 Private Cloud/Virtualization  
 Public/Hybrid Cloud   
 Reporting and Analytics  
 Network Insight  
 DNS, DHCP and IPAM (DDI) 
 IPAM for Microsoft 
 DNS Appliance
 DNS Firewall 
 Threat Insight  
 Advanced DNS Security  
 Active Trust  
 Net MRI

References 

Companies based in Santa Clara, California
Technology companies based in the San Francisco Bay Area
Companies formerly listed on the New York Stock Exchange
Information technology management
1999 establishments in Illinois
Computer companies established in 1999
2012 initial public offerings
Private equity portfolio companies
2016 mergers and acquisitions